Dreyfus may refer to:

 Dreyfus (surname)
 Dreyfus affair, a French political scandal
 Dreyfus (1930 film), a German film on the Dreyfus affair
 Dreyfus (1931 film), a British film on the Dreyfus affair
 Dreyfus Corporation, a Mellon Financial Corporation subsidiary
 Disques Dreyfus, a French record label
 The Camille and Henry Dreyfus Foundation, a United States-based charitable foundation
 Dreyfus Prize in the Chemical Sciences, a chemistry award
 6317 Dreyfus, a main-belt asteroid

See also
 
 Louis Dreyfus Company, a European trading company
 Dreyfuss
 Dreifuss